Tasha Layton (born October 27, 1982) is an American contemporary Christian music singer and songwriter.

Layton had her first CCM radio hit in 2019 with her debut radio single "Love Lifting Me". However, her second radio single, "Into the Sea (It's Gonna Be OK)" released in 2020, has been labelled her breakthrough song, and has seen her elevated into the Billboard Top 5 Female Christian Artists in 2020.

In 2021, her single "Look What You've Done" became her first ten top single on the Billboard Hot Christian Songs chart and her first number one Christian Airplay single. A Good Morning America segment introduced her as "one of the fastest rising stars in Christian music".

In 2022, her debut album "How Far" was released in May. The title track has become her first top five single on the Billboard Hot Christian Songs chart and her second number one Christian Airplay single.

Early life and education 
Layton is originally from Pauline, South Carolina. She grew up Southern Baptist and converted to Assemblies of God when she was young. While she was a teenager, her church had undergone a split and she had struggles with her faith. She changed her college major from music to religion and tried out multiple religions. She eventually returned to Christianity after attending a small church about an hour away. After graduation from college, she moved to California and enrolled at The King's Seminary in Van Nuys, Los Angeles, California where she got her Master of Divinity degree. During that time, Layton worked as a worship leader for four years and began working as a session vocalist in the city.

Career 
In 2010, she auditioned for season 9 of American Idol, reaching the third round of its Hollywood week and was sent home. Shortly after, she auditioned for and landed a background singer position for Katy Perry, and spent the next four years doing session recordings and tours. She also worked on songs used at Disneyland, Cirque du Soleil, and Nickelodeon. Afterwards, she moved to Nashville, Tennessee to pursue a solo music career, and in 2013 become an instructor at Trevecca Nazarene University.

Layton signed to BEC Recordings, and on September 5, 2018, released her first single and lyric video, "I Belong to You". In October, she released the single "Love Lifting Me". "Love Lifting Me" reached the top 25 on both the Billboard Christian Airplay and Christian AC Airplay charts.

In July 2019, she released her debut EP entitled Love Running Wild.
In April 2020, Layton released her second radio single, "Into The Sea". It reached number 12 on the Billboard Hot Christian Songs chart.

In April 2021, she released the single "Look What You've Done", and on June 11, an EP of the same name. In December, the song reached number one on the Billboard Christian Airplay chart.

Personal life 
Layton is married to musician and producer Keith Everette Smith. They have two children.

Discography

Studio albums

EPs

Singles released to radio

As featured artist

Other charting tracks

References

External links 
 

Living people
1982 births
21st-century American singers
21st-century Christians
21st-century American women singers
American Idol participants
American performers of Christian music
Musicians from Los Angeles
Singers from South Carolina
Performers of contemporary Christian music
Singers from Nashville, Tennessee